The KYK-13 Electronic Transfer Device is a common fill device designed by the United States National Security Agency for the transfer and loading of cryptographic keys with their corresponding check word. The KYK-13 is battery powered and uses the DS-102 protocol for key transfer. Its National Stock Number is 5810-01-026-9618.

Even though the KYK-13 was first introduced in 1976 and was supposed to have been obsoleted by the AN/CYZ-10 Data Transfer Device, it is still widely used because of its simplicity and reliability. A simpler device than the CYZ-10, the KIK-30 "Really Simple Key loader" (RASKL) is now planned to replace the KYK-13s, with up to $200 million budgeted to procure them in quantity.

Components

 P1 and J1 Connectors - Electrically the same connection. Used to connect to a fill cable, COMSEC device, KOI-18, KYX-15, another KYK-13, or AN/CYZ-10.
 Battery Compartment - Holds battery which powers KYK-13.
 Mode Switch - Three position rotary switch used to select operation modes.
 "Z" - Used to zeroize selected keys.
 ON - Used to fill and transfer keys.
 OFF CHECK - Used to conduct parity checks.
 Parity Lamp - Blinks when parity is checked or fill is transferred.
 Initiate Push button - Push this button when loading or zeroizing the KYK-13.
 Address Select Switch - Seven position rotary switch.
 "Z" ALL - Zeroizes all 6 storage registers when mode switch is set to "Z".
 1 THROUGH 6 - Six storage registers for storing keys in KYK-13.

References

Key management
National Security Agency encryption devices
Military equipment introduced in the 1970s